The 1990 Trans America Athletic Conference baseball tournament was held at Centenary Park on the campus of Centenary College of Louisiana in Shreveport, Louisiana. This was the twelfth tournament championship held by the Trans America Athletic Conference, in its twelfth year of existence.  won their third consecutive and overall tournament championship and earned the conference's automatic bid to the 1990 NCAA Division I baseball tournament.

Format and seeding 
The top two finishers from each division by conference winning percentage qualified for the tournament, with the top seed from one division playing the second seed from the opposite in the first round.

Bracket

All-Tournament Team 
The following players were named to the All-Tournament Team.

Most Valuable Player 
Todd Greene was named Tournament Most Valuable Player. Greene was an outfielder for Georgia Southern.

References 

Tournament
ASUN Conference Baseball Tournament
1990 in sports in Louisiana